John Bulloch may refer to:
John Bulloch (politician), American politician in Georgia
John Bulloch (journalist) (1928–2010)
John Bulloch, founder of Canadian Federation of Independent Business

See also
John Bullock (disambiguation)